The Hyundai Nu engine was introduced in the 2011 Hyundai Elantra to replace the previous Beta engines. It was designed to fill the gap between the new Gamma 1.6L and the 2.0L Theta II.

Nu MPi

1.8L (G4NB) 
This engine features MPI, and Dual-Continuous Variable Valve Timing aka D-CVVT.

Hyundai Nu engine Specification:

 Displacement: 
 Compression ratio 10.3:1–10.5:1
 Power:  @ 6,500 rpm
 Torque:  @ 4,700 rpm
 Redline 6,800 rpm
 Combustion Fuel system: MPI
 Valvetrain: Chain driven roller DOHC 16V D-CVVT 
 Cylinder block & head: Aluminum 
 Intake: Valve controlled Variable Induction System

Applications

Hyundai Elantra (MD) (2010–2015)
Hyundai i30 (GD) (2011–2017)
Hyundai Mistra (2014–present)
Kia Forte (YD) (2013–2016)
Kia K4 (2014–2021)

2.0L (G4NA)

Applications
Hyundai Creta (GS) (2014–2020)
Hyundai Creta (SU2r) (2021–2022)
Hyundai Elantra (UD) (2013–2015)
Hyundai Elantra (AD) (2015–2020)
Hyundai i40 (2011–2019)
Hyundai Mistra (CF) (2013–2020)
Hyundai Sonata (YF) (2014)
 Hyundai Tucson/ix35 (LM) (2013–2015)
Hyundai Tucson (TL) (2015–2018)
Kia Carens (RP) (2013–2019)
Kia Forte (YD) (2012–2018)
Kia K4 (2014–2021)
Kia KX3 (KC) (2015–2019)
Kia Soul (2012–2019)
Kia Sportage (2014–2021)

2.0L CVVL (G4ND)

Applications
Hyundai Sonata (LF) (2014–2019)
Kia Optima (2012–2019)

2.0L Atkinson Cycle (G4NH)

The engine promises improved fuel economy vs the Nu MPi 2.0L (G4NA) engine and better thermal efficiency. 

Applications
Hyundai Elantra (AD) (2015–2020)
Hyundai Kona (OS) (2017–2020)
Hyundai Tucson (TL) (2015–2020)
Hyundai Veloster (JS) (2018–2020)
Kia Forte (BD) (2018–present)
Kia Seltos (2019–present)
Kia Soul (SK3) (2019–present)

Nu GDi

2.0L (G4NC) 

Applications
Hyundai Elantra (MD) (2013–2015)
Hyundai Elantra Coupe (JK) (2014)
Hyundai i30 (GD) (2014–2016)
Hyundai i30 (PD) (2016–present)
Hyundai i40 (2012–2019)
Hyundai Tucson (LM) (2013–2015)
Hyundai Tucson (TL) (2015–2020)
Kia Carens (RP) (2013–2019)
Kia Forte (YD) (2012–2018)
Kia KX5 (2015–2021)
Kia KX7 (2016–2022)
Kia Soul (2012–2019)
Kia Sportage (QL) (2015–2021)
Kia Sportage Ace (NP) (2021–present)

Nu Flex
Flex fuel compatible engine of the Nu MPi.

2.0L (F4NA)

Applications
Hyundai Creta (GS) (2017–2021)
Kia Sportage (QL) (2015–2021)

Nu Hybrid

2.0L MPi Hybrid (G4NE)

Applications
Hyundai Sonata Hybrid (2011–2014)
Kia Optima Hybrid (2011–2015)

2.0L GDi Hybrid (G4NG)

Applications
Hyundai Sonata Hybrid (2014–2019)
Kia Optima Hybrid (2015–2019)

Nu LPi
Uses Liquefied petroleum gas instead.

2.0L (L4NA)

Applications
Hyundai Sonata (2012–present)
Kia Carens (RP) (2013–2018)
Kia Optima (2011–2021)

Engine recall
On December 2, 2020, Hyundai and Kia recalled 423,000 vehicles equipped with various engines following a joint review by Hyundai and the NHTSA, of which the Nu GDi engines were a part of. Affected vehicles include the 2016 Hyundai Sonata Hybrid, 2014-2015 Kia Forte and Forte Koup, and the 2014-2015 Kia Soul.

See also
List of Hyundai engines

References

Nu
Nu Engine in the LF Hyundai Sonata Hybrid
http://www.hyundainews.com/us/en/models/sonata-hybrid/2017
Straight-four engines
Gasoline engines by model